The 2014 Big West Conference men's basketball tournament took place March 13–15, 2014 at the Honda Center in Anaheim, California. The champion Cal Poly Mustangs received the conference's automatic bid to the 2014 NCAA Men's Division I Basketball Tournament.

Format
The top eight teams qualified for the 2014 Big West tournament. In the semifinals, the highest seed played the lowest seed, while the remaining two teams matched up.

Bracket

References

Big West Conference men's basketball tournament
2013–14 Big West Conference men's basketball season
Big West Conference men's basketball tournament
Big West Conference men's basketball tournament